Rafflesia keithii is a parasitic flowering plant in the genus Rafflesia endemic to Sabah in Borneo. The flowers can grow up to one metre in diameter.  It is named after Henry (Harry) George Keith, former Conservator of Forests in North Borneo (now Sabah).

References

External links
 Parasitic plants: Rafflesia keithii

keithii
Parasitic plants
Endemic flora of Borneo
Flora of Sabah
Flora of the Borneo montane rain forests